The Edo State House of Assembly is the unicameral legislative branch of the government of Edo State of Nigeria.

References

External links
 Edo State House of Assembly

Politics of Edo State
Government of Edo State
State legislatures of Nigeria